Kenderdine Mill Complex is a historic grist mill complex located at Horsham Township, Montgomery County, Pennsylvania.  The complex includes four contributing buildings and one contributing structure.  They are the original fieldstone mill (1734-1735), mill race, early 19th century fieldstone mill owner's house, stable and carriage house (1858), and an early fieldstone house.

It was added to the National Register of Historic Places in 1992.

The buildings today are a private residence.

References

Grinding mills on the National Register of Historic Places in Pennsylvania
Industrial buildings completed in 1858
Grinding mills in Montgomery County, Pennsylvania
Houses in Montgomery County, Pennsylvania
National Register of Historic Places in Montgomery County, Pennsylvania